The Giuseppe Pitrè – Salvatore Salomone Marino International Prize for Ethnohistory is awarded since 1958 for an outstanding book or long essay on demoethnoanthropological issues. The prize is one of the oldest and most distinguished awards granted in the field of Cultural anthropology and Ethnohistory. It is named in honour of Giuseppe Pitrè.

Overview
The prize is named after Italian folklorists Giuseppe Pitrè and Salvatore Salomone Marino. It is awarded annually by the Centro Internazionale Di Etnostoria in partnership with the University of Palermo and the city of Palermo.

Past winners
 Maja Bošković-Stulli
 Juha Pentikäinen
 Anna Birgitta Rooth
 Philip Carl Salzman

References 

Academic awards
Awards established in 1958
International awards